Christopher Thomas Stamp (7 July 1942 – 24 November 2012) was a British music producer and manager known for co-managing and producing such musical acts as the Who and Jimi Hendrix in the 1960s and 1970s and co-founding the now defunct Track Records. He later became a psychodrama therapist based in New York State.

Childhood
Born into a working-class family, Stamp was raised in London's East End and was one of six children. Their father, Thomas Stamp, was a tugboat captain, and their mother was Ethel (née Perrott). Actor Terence Stamp is his older brother.

Career in film and music
Stamp started out as a filmmaker and met business partner and collaborator Kit Lambert while working at Shepperton Film Studios as an assistant director—they both worked on such films as I Could Go On Singing, The L-Shaped Room and Of Human Bondage. Eventually the pair came to share a flat in west London, and in 1963 Lambert convinced Stamp that the two should direct their own film about the burgeoning British rock scene. "Our idea was to find a group that somehow represented the emerging ideas of our time. They would be rebellious, anarchistic and uniquely different from the established English pop scene," said Stamp.

Stamp and Lambert met the members of The Who during one of their performances at the Railway Hotel (no longer standing) in Harrow and Wealdstone. At that time the band was known as The High Numbers. Lambert said the following of the experience:

Stamp and Lambert's contrasting personalities and backgrounds also made an impression on the band; in a 1972 Rolling Stone article Keith Moon said that the two men "were...are...as incongruous a team as [The Who] are". Lambert was an Oxford graduate and the son of noted composer Constant Lambert; he spoke proper and high-class English. In contrast, Stamp was five years younger, the son of a tug-boatman, and Keith Moon described Stamp as speaking "in nearly unintelligible East London cockney". Roger Daltrey said the following about the pair:

The duo made a move to acquire the High Numbers from their manager Peter Meaden; Lambert had learned from The Beatles' attorney David Jacobs that the band's contract with their previous manager was legally invalid. In effect, Meaden had no legal claim to the band and in 1964 he accepted a buyout for relinquishing control to Stamp and Lambert.

By autumn of that same year Stamp and Lambert convinced the band to change their name back to The Who (a name they were using prior to Meaden's management) and began to focus on the band's Mod image. The band managers also encouraged the band's early Mod look and also encouraged the band to include more blues and James Brown and Motown covers in their sets – since this was the sound most enjoyed by the Mod crowd.

The new band managers also shot a short promotional movie for The Who in 1964 which they would sometimes show at the Who's live performances, before the band would take to the stage. Drawing from their filmmaking backgrounds, the duo also began to focus on the Who's stage show. They sent the band for lessons on how to apply stage makeup, and began to insist that the band have control of its own stage lighting during shows, which was virtually unheard of at the time. On occasion, Stamp and Lambert even became part of the act themselves; during one performance in 1966 they lit and tossed fire bombs onto the stage as the band played.

By late 1966, with two hit albums by The Who under their belts, Stamp and Lambert established their own record label. The following year they signed artist Jimi Hendrix and founded Track Record Records, eventually known simply as just Track Records. Soon the label released its first single, "Purple Haze", followed by their first album, Are You Experienced. Track Records went on to profit from hit singles such as "Fire" by the band The Crazy World of Arthur Brown, which reached No. 1 in the UK and Canada and No. 2 on the US Billboard charts, as well as "Eight Miles High" by The Byrds, which reached No. 14 on the Billboard Hot 100. Stamp and Lambert also helped launch The Who's seminal rock opera Tommy.

During a 2005 interview, Roger Daltrey stated the following about Tommy:

Stamp and Lambert profited well from the music business and were living the lifestyles of the rock stars they managed, which (as Stamp would later admit) also included heavy consumption of drugs: "We were out to lunch, no doubt about that," he said. As the 1970s progressed, the members of The Who were beset by many physical and emotional setbacks, and Lambert's drug use also became so heavy that he began dipping into the Who's royalties. By 1975 Stamp and Lambert were ousted by the band in favour of manager Bill Curbishley, and the pair relocated to New York City to produce American R&B/soul group Labelle. Track Records continued with releases by Shakin Stevens and The Heartbreakers but folded in 1978.

Following the demise of Track Records, Stamp remained in New York, but Kit Lambert had moved to Italy, dying in 1981 of a brain haemorrhage while at his mother's London home. Stamp's drug and alcohol use continued, and in 1987 he entered a drug rehabilitation programme; the experience helped to inspire Stamp to assist others with their addictions and he began to study experiential therapies, including psychodrama.

Chris Stamp continued to work on Who-related projects and to give interviews about his forays into the music business. He provided liner notes for the 1995 re-release of The Who's 1966 album A Quick One, and provided a foreword to the 2005 re-release of The Who biography Anyway Anyhow Anywhere: The Complete Chronicle of the Who 1958-1978. In 2005, he also gave an informal presentation at the Rock and Roll Hall of Fame as part of their programme "From Songwriters to Soundmen: The People Behind the Hits". He also sat on the advisory board of the John Entwistle Foundation, formed in honour of The Who's bass guitarist.

In 2014, an American documentary film was made about Kit Lambert and Chris Stamp entitled, Lambert & Stamp. It was produced and directed by James D. Cooper. It had its world premiere at 2014 Sundance Film Festival on 20 January 2014.

Career in psychotherapy
Until his death Stamp worked as a psychodrama therapist and addiction counsellor. Trained at the Psychodrama Institute of New York and the Hudson Valley Psychodrama Institute, he was a Licensed Mental Health Counsellor (LMHC), a Credentialed Alcoholism and Substance Abuse Counsellor (CASAC), a Certified Experiential Therapist (CET), and an Auricular Acupuncture Detox Specialist (ADS). He worked as a consultant for the Freedom Institute in New York City and kept a private practice in East Hampton, New York.

Death
Stamp died of cancer on 24 November 2012 at Mount Sinai Hospital in New York City. He was survived by his wife of 33 years, Calixte, his daughters Rosie and Amie, his sons-in-law Edmund and Nicholas and several grandchildren; Betsy, Thomas, Gracie, Evie, Esmé and Maggie as well as his elder brother Terence, younger brothers Richard and John, and sister Lynette. He was 70 years old.

Discography

Filmography

TV appearances
 Stamp appeared in the second episode of the BBC documentary series Pop Britannia, which originally aired on Friday, 11 January 2008.
 Stamp appeared in an episode of VH1's Behind the Music series about Keith Moon.
 Stamp appeared in an episode of the BBC documentary series 'Imagine...' entitled 'Jimi Hendrix: Hear My Train a Comin' originally aired in 2013

References

External links
 Lambert & Stamp documentary - Sony Classics
 
Photo of Chris Stamp & Pete Townshend - New York, Madison Square Garden, September 2006

1942 births
2012 deaths
British record producers
British music managers
Alcohol abuse counselors
Psychodramatists
British expatriates in the United States
Businesspeople from London
Businesspeople from New York City
People from East Hampton (town), New York
Deaths from cancer in New York (state)
20th-century American businesspeople
20th-century English businesspeople